Nora Payne is an American singer-songwriter and background vocalist best known for her work with producer Rodney "Darkchild" Jerkins. Payne has written for Michael Jackson, Will Smith, Jennifer Lopez, and Brandy, among others. 

In October 2017, Payne was reported missing by her family after a layover at O'Hare International Airport and was found two weeks later in a Chicago, Illinois hospital.

Songwriting and background vocal credits

Credits are courtesy of Discogs, Spotify, and AllMusic.

Awards and nominations

References 

Living people
African-American songwriters
American rhythm and blues singer-songwriters
Year of birth missing (living people)